Biebertal is a municipality in the district of Gießen, in Hesse, Germany. It is situated 7 km northwest of Gießen.
It is Denbigh's twin town

References

Giessen (district)